Dr. James Peter Mazepa (born 1941) is an American philatelist who was appointed to the Roll of Distinguished Philatelists in 2015. Mazepa specialises in the philately of Poland and Mexico and is an internationally accredited philatelic judge. He received the Luff Award in 2010 from the American Philatelic Society.

Mazepa was president of the Federación Interamericana de Filatelia from 2008 to 2014.

References 

1941 births
American philatelists
Living people
Philately of Poland
Philately of Mexico
Signatories to the Roll of Distinguished Philatelists